Christophe Bourdon (born 13 March 1970) is a French breaststroke swimmer. He competed in two events at the 1992 Summer Olympics.

References

External links
 

1970 births
Living people
French male breaststroke swimmers
Olympic swimmers of France
Swimmers at the 1992 Summer Olympics
Sportspeople from Versailles, Yvelines
Mediterranean Games medalists in swimming
Swimmers at the 1987 Mediterranean Games
Swimmers at the 1991 Mediterranean Games
Mediterranean Games silver medalists for France
20th-century French people
21st-century French people